Brachypterus urticae is a species of short-winged flower beetles native to Europe.

References

Kateretidae
Beetles described in 1792
Beetles of Europe